Mordellistenoda is a genus of beetles in the family Mordellidae, containing the following species:

 Mordellistenoda atrilimbata Shiyake, 1997
 Mordellistenoda australiensis Ermisch, 1963
 Mordellistenoda donan Tsuru, 2004
 Mordellistenoda fukiensis Ermisch, 1941 
 Mordellistenoda ismayi Batten, 1990
 Mordellistenoda melana Fan & Yang, 1995
 Mordellistenoda memnonia Shiyake, 1997
 Mordellistenoda nigricans Shiyake, 1997
 Mordellistenoda notialis Shiyake, 1997
 Mordellistenoda trapezoides Batten, 1990

References

Mordellidae